Duarte António Borges Coutinho, 4th Marquess of Praia e Monforte (18 November 1921 – 19 May 1981), commonly known simply as Borges Coutinho, was the 26th president of Portuguese sports club S.L. Benfica.

Born in Lisbon and educated both in England and Portugal, Borges Coutinho became a member of Benfica in 1959, aged 37. Ten years later, he became president of the club after defeating candidates Fernando Martins and Romão Martins in the elections on 12 April 1969, with 58 percent of the votes. During his eight-year presidency (four consecutive biennal terms), the football team won seven Primeira Liga titles (personal record) – one of them without defeat, in the 1972–73 campaign – and three Taça de Portugal trophies. This allowed Benfica to consolidate their hegemony in Portuguese football.

Under Borges Coutinho's term, in 1969, Benfica took possession of lands near their stadium, Estádio da Luz, in order to create three football pitches, one synthetic athletics track, and eight tennis courts. After deciding not to contest the elections on 26 May 1977, he was succeeded by José Ferreira Queimado.

Borges Coutinho died at the age of 59 in Greater London, England.

References

1921 births
1981 deaths
People from Lisbon
Portuguese nobility
Portuguese expatriates in the United Kingdom
S.L. Benfica presidents
Portuguese football chairmen and investors